Ferenc Peter Jongejan (born 20 October 1978) is a Dutch former professional baseball player.

Professional career
Jongejan played Minor League Baseball in the Chicago Cubs' farm system between 2001 and 2004 with the Lansing Lugnuts, West Tenn Diamond Jaxx, Iowa Cubs and Daytona Cubs.

In October 2012, he was named the manager of UVV Utrecht in the Honkbal Hoofdklasse. He remained in that position until August 2016. During the 2014 season, he suited up and appeared in a single game for his team.

International career
Jongejan represented the Netherlands at the 2000 Summer Olympics in Sydney where he and his team became fifth. Four years later at the 2004 Summer Olympics in Athens they were sixth.

, he was the manager of the Netherlands women's national softball team.

References

External links
Jongejan at the Dutch Olympic Archive

1978 births
Living people
Baseball player-managers
Baseball players at the 2000 Summer Olympics
Baseball players at the 2004 Summer Olympics
Daytona Cubs players
Dutch expatriate baseball players in the United States
Dutch sports coaches
Iowa Cubs players
Lansing Lugnuts players
National team coaches
Olympic baseball players of the Netherlands
People from Hoorn
Softball coaches
West Tennessee Diamond Jaxx players
UVV players
Sportspeople from North Holland